Kyaw Ko Ko (born 20 December 1992) is a Burmese professional footballer who plays as a striker for the Myanmar national team. He scored five goals in the 2011 Southeast Asian Games and helped the Myanmar U23 team to secure a third-place finish and a bronze medal. He is the star striker of Myanmar National Team. He was ranked #7 in the "World's Best Top Scorers" list by the IFFHS in 2014. Considered one of the best players in the ASEAN, he is known for his dribbling, finishing, skill, pace, and ability to play with both feet.He is Yangon United's all-time second-highest goalscorer with 58 Goals.

Career

Zeyar Shwe Myay FC
Zeyar Shwe Myay signed Kyaw Ko Ko from Zeyar Youth team. Kyaw Ko Ko showed his talent in Zeyar Shwe Myay. And he became Myanmar National Team striker. In 2013, he moved to Yangon United with highest transfer fee.

Yangon United
Kyaw Ko Ko become main striker in Yangon United and Myanmar national football team. He won twice Myanmar National League champions and one General Aung San Shield champion.

Chiangrai United
In December 2017, Chiangrai United signed Kyaw Ko Ko for a 1-year loan. In a match against Pattaya United on 7 April 2018 Kyaw Ko Ko was tackled by Sarawut Kanlayanabandit and tore a ligament in his knee, ruling him out for several months and making him miss the 2018 AFF Championship.

Samut Prakan City
On 26 December 2018, Kyaw Ko Ko moved from Yangon United to Samut Prakan City on 1-year loan deal.

Favourite Footballer
“My favourite footballer is Ronaldinho. I think he is even better than Messi as Messi doesn’t have as much footballing skill as Ronaldinho.

“Ronaldinho’s tricks are great and his dribbling very neat. He seems to treat the ball so lightly and easily. I like his style of playing.”

As for Myanmar footballers, he says his favourites are Soe Myat Min and Aung Kyaw Moe, centre forward and central midfielder respectively, who both played for Finance and Revenue.

International

International goals 
Scores and results list Myanmar's goal tally first.

Honours

National Team
Philippine Peace Cup (1): 2014

Club
Yangon United
Myanmar National League (2): 2013, 2015
Chiangrai United
 Thailand Champions Cup (1): 2018

Individual
 MFF Player of the Year (1): 2011

Personal life
Kyaw Ko Ko along with Burmese women's footballer Than Than Htwe are part of the ‘Protect the Goal’ for Burmese athletes to raise awareness in Burma on HIV/AIDS and prevention.

References

1992 births
Living people
People from Mandalay Region
Burmese footballers
Myanmar international footballers
Association football forwards
Yangon United F.C. players
HIV/AIDS activists
Southeast Asian Games bronze medalists for Myanmar
Competitors at the 2011 Southeast Asian Games